Yuri is the 20th studio album by Mexican pop singer Yuri. Released in 2004, it has sold more than 44,000 copies. This album was also released under the name A lo Mexicano. Several famous singers are featured in the album.

Reception
Mexican singer Yuri sang this "ranchero" album under the Sony Music production label. Sony Music distributed the album outside of Mexico, but promoted it only within Mexico. The album was released in two editions. The first edition, called "Yuri," was distributed exclusively in Mexico, USA and Puerto Rico. The second edition, called "A lo Mexicano," was remade for distribution in South America. The song tracks in both albums are similar.

Track listing 
Tracks []:

Singles
 Mi rechazo (only Mexico and United States)
 Tu cárcel (only Peru)
 Cosas del amor (only in Colombia)
 Y llegaste tú (only in Mexico)

2004 albums
Yuri (Mexican singer) albums